Young Marx is a play by Richard Bean and Clive Coleman about the early life of Karl Marx.

It was the opening production at the Bridge Theatre in London (residency of the London Theatre Company), a new commercial theatre founded by previous National Theatre artistic director Nicholas Hytner and executive director Nick Starr. The production opened the theatre on Friday 27 October 2017, following previews from Wednesday 18 October, and ran until Sunday 31 December 2017. The production was also broadcast through National Theatre Live in December.

The production starred Rory Kinnear in the title role and Oliver Chris as Friedrich Engels and reunited the creative team of Bean's previous hit play One Man Two Guvnors (which premiered at the National Theatre), directed by Hytner, designed by Mark Thompson, music by Grant Olding, lighting by Mark Henderson and sound by Paul Arditti.

On 17 August, the full company was announced alongside Kinnear and Chris.

Plot 
The description published on the play's information page on the Bridge Theatre's website is as follows:

Cast and characters

References

External links 
 Page on The Bridge Theatre website

2017 plays
British political plays
Plays by Richard Bean
Works about Karl Marx
Cultural depictions of Karl Marx
Plays based on real people
Comedy plays
Plays set in the 19th century
Biographical plays about writers
Biographical plays about philosophers